Virginia Hill Historic District is a national historic district located at Bristol, Virginia. The district encompasses 134 contributing buildings in a predominantly residential area of Bristol. The neighborhood developed in the late-19th and early-20th centuries, and contains primarily one- to two-story frame and brick dwellings constructed from 1868 to the 1940s. Notable buildings include the I.C. Fowler House (1868), 513 Lee Street (1882), A.W. Randolph House (c. 1890), Jean McNeil Pepper House, and Thomas Jefferson Public School (1923).

It was listed on the National Register of Historic Places in 2003.

References

National Register of Historic Places in Bristol, Virginia
Buildings and structures in Bristol, Virginia
Historic districts on the National Register of Historic Places in Virginia